Sangaman Kanda or Sangaman Kandy is a small village in Ampara. It is located within Eastern Province of Sri Lanka. It is the east extreme points of Sri Lanka and located at 3 meters above the sea level.

References 

Villages in Ampara District